Keulemans or Ceulemans is a Dutch surname. It may be of topographic origin, indicating an origin from Cologne (Dutch Keulen) or from a Keule (a Limburgish dialectical form of kuil, "hollow" / "depression"). Alternatively, it may be patronymic, stemming from Cole, an archaic short form of Nicolaas. Ceulemans is a relatively common name in Belgium (4943 people in 2008), especially in the province of Antwerp. People with the surname include:

François Ceulemans (fl. 1920), Belgian sport shooter
Jan Ceulemans (born 1957), Belgian football midfielder; most-capped Belgian national footballer
Jan Ceulemans (basketball) (born 1926), Belgian basketball player
James Keulemans (born 1970), Dutch-British international rugby player who also had one cap with Bahrain.
 Michael Keulemans (born 1942), Dutch-British researcher and author of 'Bishops: The Changing Nature of the Anglican Episcopate in Mainland Britain' and 'Never to Sail in Her.'
John Gerrard Keulemans (1842–1912), Dutch bird illustrator
Larissa and Axana Ceulemans (born 1968 & 1970), co-founders of the Belgian pop girl group Def Dames Dope 
 (1908–1977), Dutch chemist, pioneer in gas chromatography
Maarten Keulemans (born 1968), Dutch science journalist and founder of the website ExitMundi.nl
Joseph Keulemans (born 1998), International sports agent, responsible for breaking the British women’s football transfer record in 2018.
Raymond Ceulemans (born 1937), Belgian carom billiards player, 35-fold world champion
 (born 1972), Belgian long-distance runner

References

Dutch-language surnames
Patronymic surnames
Toponymic surnames